Idel-Ural, literally Volga-Ural, is a historical region in Eastern Europe, in what is today Russia. The name literally means Volga-Urals in the Tatar language. The frequently used Russian variant is Volgo-Uralye. The term Idel-Ural is often used to designate 6 republics of Russia of this region: Bashkortostan, Chuvashia, Mari El, Mordovia, Tatarstan and Udmurtia, especially in Tatar-language literature or in the context of minority languages. 

Idel-Ural is at the center of the Volga Federal District (Поволжье, Povolzhye). The major religions in the region are Islam and Orthodox Christianity.

Before being conquered by the Tsardom of Russia in the 16th century, the region was dominated by native Uralic tribes and a succession of empires, such as Volga Bulgaria, the Khazars, the Golden Horde and the Khanate of Kazan. At the time of Peter the Great's death, in the early 18th century, the region had been made up of roughly 1 million people, with around half being Tatars, Chuvash, and Bashkirs.

See also 
 Idel-Ural State
 Idel-Ural Legion
 Free Idel-Ural

References 

Historical regions in Russia
Geography of Russia
Historical regions